The athletics competition at the 2013 European Youth Summer Olympic Festival was held from 15 to 19 July 2013. The events took place  in Utrecht, Netherlands. Boys and girls born 1996 or 1997 or later participated 36 track and field events, divided evenly between the sexes.

Medal summary

Boys

Girls

See also
 European Youth Olympic Festival

References

Results (archived)

2013 European Youth Summer Olympic Festival
European Youth Summer Olympic Festival
2013
International athletics competitions hosted by the Netherlands